Islam Abbaas (born March 11, 1980) is a Palestinian-Jordanian professional basketball player. He is a member of the Jordan national basketball team.

Abbaas competed with the Jordanian team at the FIBA Asia Championship 2007 and FIBA Asia Championship 2009.  In 2009, Abbaas helped the Jordanian team to a national best third-place finish by averaging 4.6 points and 5.4 rebounds per game.

Although Abbaas saw limited action off the bench for most of the 2009 tournament, he scored 23 points and grabbed a tournament-high 19 rebounds in only 23 minutes of action in a first round 105-47 win over Indonesia. He was also a member of the Jilin Northeast Tigers at one point.

References

1980 births
Living people
Jilin Northeast Tigers players
Jordanian men's basketball players
Jordanian people of Palestinian descent
Palestinian sportsmen
Basketball players at the 2006 Asian Games
Power forwards (basketball)
Asian Games competitors for Jordan